Hashida (written: 橋田 lit. "bridge field") is a Japanese surname. Notable people with the surname include:

, Japanese physician and physiologist
, Japanese weightlifter
, Japanese footballer
, Japanese screenwriter

Japanese-language surnames